This is the discography of French singer Marie Myriam.

Albums

Studio albums

Compilation albums

Singles

References

Discographies of French artists
Pop music discographies